North Barsham is a village and former civil parish, now in the parish of Barsham, in the North Norfolk district, in the county of Norfolk, England. In 1931 the parish had a population of 79.

The village is one of four settlements within the parish of Barsham. The other villages are West Barsham, East Barsham and Houghton St Giles. Originally all four villages had their own parishes, but these were merged to create a single civil parish on 1 April 1935. North Barsham is 5 miles north of the town of Fakenham, 22.8 miles southwest of Cromer and 118 miles north of London.

The nearest railway station is at Sheringham for the Bittern Line. The nearest airport is Norwich International Airport.

External links

References

Villages in Norfolk
Former civil parishes in Norfolk
North Norfolk